Vera Ivanovna Nazina (born 26 April 1931 in Leningrad, USSR) - Soviet Russian painter, Graphic artist, living and working in Saint Petersburg, a member of the Saint Petersburg Union of Artists (before 1992 - Leningrad branch of Union of Artists of Russian Federation), regarded as one of representatives of the Leningrad school of painting.

Biography
Vera Ivanovna Nazina was born on 26 April 1931 in Leningrad, USSR. In 1945-1946 she engaged in the art studio of the House of Young Pioneers and Schoolchildren of Dzerzhinsky district of Leningrad.

In 1947, Vera Nazina entered the сeramics department of the School of Art and Industry in Leningrad. In 1950, Vera Nazina transferred at the faculty of monumental and decorative painting, she studied of Alexander Kazantsev, Ivan Stepashkin, Piotr Buchkin, Gleb Savinov.<ref>Sergei V. Ivanov. Unknown Socialist Realism. The Leningrad School.- Saint Petersburg: NP-Print Edition, 2007. – p.365.</ref>

In 1955, Vera Nazina graduated from Higher School of Art and Industry named after Vera Mukhina in Alexander Kazantsev workshop. Her graduation work was genre painting named "Children at harvest".

Vera Nazina has participated in Art Exhibitions Since 1958. She paints portraits, genre paintings, home interiors, landscapes, still life, sketches from the life. Vera Nazina mostly works in the technique of tempera painting and watercolors. Her personal exhibitions were in Leningrad (1984), and in 1985 in towns of Slantsy and Ivangorod, both in Leningrad Province.

The leading theme of Vera Nazina creativity is baby images, people and way of life of the northern Russian countryside. Her paintings are distinguished decorative and dominance favorite red and pink tones, penetrating and unifying color works.

In search of plots and original materials for their work, Vera Nazina often traveled to Karelia and the Arkhangelsk region, she visited Kargopol, Shozhma, Nyandoma, Kholmogory, worked in Staraya Ladoga, and on the Academicheskaya Dacha.

Vera Nazina is a member of Saint Petersburg Union of Artists (before 1992 - the Leningrad branch of Union of Artists of Russian Federation) since 1960.

Paintings by Vera Ivanovna Nazina reside in State Russian Museum, in Art museums and private collections of Russia, France, Germany, Finland, USA, England, and in other countries.

See also
 Leningrad School of Painting
 List of Russian artists
 List of 20th-century Russian painters
 List of painters of Saint Petersburg Union of Artists
 Saint Petersburg Union of Artists

References

Bibliography
 Vern G. Swanson. Soviet Impressionism. - Woodbridge, England: Antique Collectors' Club, 2001. - pp. 139, 149.
 Sergei V. Ivanov. Unknown Socialist Realism. The Leningrad School.'' - Saint Petersburg: NP-Print Edition, 2007. – pp. 19, 21, 328, 365, 392-400, 402, 403, 405-407, 416-421, 423, 424, 444. , .

1931 births
20th-century Russian painters
21st-century Russian painters
Soviet painters
Socialist realist artists
Leningrad School artists
Russian women painters
Living people
Saint Petersburg Stieglitz State Academy of Art and Design alumni
Members of the Leningrad Union of Artists
20th-century Russian women artists
21st-century Russian women artists